In mathematics, particularly in integral calculus, the localization theorem allows, under certain conditions, to infer the nullity of a function given only information about its continuity and the value of its integral.

Let  be a real-valued function defined on some open interval Ω of the real line that is continuous in Ω. Let D be an arbitrary subinterval contained in Ω. The theorem states the following implication:

The proof is completely analogous to the single variable case, and concludes with the impossibility of finding a point  such that .

Example
An example of the use of this theorem in physics is the law of conservation of mass for fluids, which states that the mass of any fluid volume must not change:

Applying the Reynolds transport theorem, one can change the reference to an arbitrary (non-fluid) control volume Vc. Further assuming that the density function is continuous (i.e. that our fluid is monophasic and thermodynamically metastable) and that Vc is not moving relative to the chosen system of reference, the equation becomes:

As the equation holds for any such control volume, the localization theorem applies, rendering the common partial differential equation for the conservation of mass in monophase fluids:

Integral calculus